Cychropsis mandli is a species of ground beetle in the subfamily of Carabinae. It was described by Paulus in 1971.

References

mandli
Beetles described in 1971